Queen of Carthage is a 2014 New Zealand thriller drama film starring Shiloh Fernandez. In addition to acting in the film, Fernandez served as screenwriter and producer.

Plot
A young American man flees from a traumatic relationship with his sister, and travels to New Zealand to find a better life. He falls in love when he watches a singer perform at a cafe.

Cast
Shiloh Fernandez as Amos
Keisha Castle-Hughes as Simi
Graham Candy as Graham
Amanda Tito as Phoenix
Astra McLaren as Jane
Josh McKenzie as Phoenix's Brother
Toby Lawry as Frank
Colin Michael Day as Jamey
Rose McIver as Jane (voice)

Release
The film made its world premiere at the Montreal World Film Festival on August 22, 2014.

References

External links
 

New Zealand thriller drama films
2014 thriller drama films
2014 drama films
2010s English-language films